Manuel Antonio Bonilla Nava (October 15, 1806 – 23 December 1880) was a Costa Rican politician. 

He was born in Cartago. His parents were Félix de Bonilla y Pacheco and Catalina de Nava López del Corral, the daughter of the Spanish Governor José Joaquín de Nava y Cabezudo. In San José, Costa Rica, May 16, 1830 he married Jesús Carrillo y Morales, the daughter of Basilio Carrillo Colina and Jacinta Morales y Saravia, the niece of Braulio Carrillo Colina, head of state from 1835 to 1837 and from 1838 to 1842.

In 1841 he was elected as Deputy Chief of State and Minister General, positions he held until the fall of the government of Braulio Carrillo Colina on April 12, 1842. He was temporarily in charge of the head of the State from April 8 to 12, 1842.

1806 births
1880 deaths
Date of death missing
People from Cartago Province
Costa Rican people of Spanish descent
Vice presidents of Costa Rica